New Page is a Burmese musical-drama television series directed by Cesar de Lorme. It aired on Canal+ Zat Lenn. Its season 1 aired from October 14 to December 16, 2018, on every Sunday at 19:00 for 10 episodes and season 2 aired from August 15 to October 17, 2019, on every Thursday at 20:00 for 10 episodes.

Cast
Aung Myint Myat as Kyaw Thura
Nant Chit Nadi Zaw as Nayee Oo
Aung Paing as Htun Naung
Htun Naung Sint as Soe Htun Aung
Wai Lar Ri as Myat Thiri Wai
Hsu Htet Hlaing as Nway Tay Cho
Than Than Soe as Daw Saw Mya Kyi
Phu Sone as Daw Nilar Kyaw
Yadanar Wyne as Myat Lay Nwe
Rebecca Win as Rebecca Win
Shwe Sin as Than Thar Nwe
Ngwe Soe as Saya Phone Myint Thu
Thura Maung Cho as Ko Ko Oo
Shwe Poe Kaung as Shwe Poe Kaung

References

Burmese television series